The Three Friends and Jerry is a children's animated television series produced by Happy Life and TMO Film GmbH (Germany) in association with Nickelodeon UK and Nickelodeon Germany. The show was created by the Swedish illustrator Magnus Carlsson.

HIT Entertainment distributes the series internationally and is listed in the end credits. When HIT Entertainment partnered to launch PBS Kids Sprout in 2005, The Three Friends and Jerry was made available on Sprout on Demand.

Plot
Jerry is the new kid in town who does not fit with any of his classmates. This show follows his best attempts to join the 'Three Friends' - Thomas, Eric, and their leader Frank - who do not want him to be part of their group but still let him hang out with them as long as he helps them with their schemes or problems. The friends are often joined by three of their girl classmates: Linda, Mimmi, and Tess and try (and usually fail) to win them over. Usually their antics often result in humiliating situations. Apart from school, the group have to contend with parents, bullies and their own conflicts.

The show takes place in the town of Carlsonville (most likely named after Magnus himself), which is set either in Sweden or the UK.

Characters

Main
 Jerry is the new kid in town, who has blond hair and buck teeth. He is a calm and bright boy with a head full of ideas. He desperately wants to join the eponymous Three Friends, but they do not see him as part of their group.
 Frank is the leader of the Three Friends. He is a bald-headed boy who wears a blue T-shirt with a yellow number 1. The polar opposite to Jerry, Frank is short-tempered and cunning. Due to his appearance, he is seen as the ugliest boy in school. He ineffectively tries to win the heart of the leader of the girl gang – Linda – despite the fact they are actually cousins.
 Thomas is a boy with an orange hoodie, never seen without his big green cap. He is dominated by Frank and normally takes his side. Thomas is a very good artist, but he is self-conscious and feels that he needs to hide his creative nature.
 Eric is a boy with chin-length blond hair and a green T-shirt. He loves football and is the best sports player in the school. Just like Thomas, Eric is dominated by Frank.
 Linda is the leader of the girl gang who sometimes acts like a spoiled brat and uses strong language. She is a bit tougher and a little more mature than her two friends, Mimmi and Tess. Linda is also Frank's cousin.
 Mimmi is an Asian girl who lives next door to Linda and has a swimming pool in her garden. She wears a blue dress with a smiley face symbol. Her adoptive father has his own business and lots of money. Mimmi considers her wealth as her main asset.
 Tess - a short and shy girl who tends to blindly follow Linda. Tess's older brother, Tony, is a cool teenager who drives her to school on his moped. Tess has short blonde hair and wears a white shirt, purple skirt, and green shoes.

Minor
 The Teacher teaches Jerry's class. She always has unshaven legs. The Three Friends and Jerry often try to send her into space so they will not have any lessons.
 The PE Teacher is Jerry's bad-tempered father. He tends to act very loud with the Three Friends and his son, but he has a good heart and intentions. He has red hair and an athletic and muscular body. He lives in a one-floor house with his wife and son.
Jerry's mother is the PE Teacher's wife. She has a caring and calm personality. Jerry inherited his looks and personality from her.
 Roy Johnson is Mimmi's adoptive father and the wealthiest person in the town. He runs the local shop.
 Monica is an attractive brunette who works at Roy's shop. She is also Tony's girlfriend.
 Tony is a heavy metal guitarist, Tess' 16-year-old brother and Monica's boyfriend.
 Dick Priest keeps an eye on the town. As a priest, he works in the church. Despite campaigning against everything immoral, he is revealed to be a fan of metal music and horror movies.
 Mr. and Mrs. Ingrid Bertwhistle are Jerry's neighbours. Mr. Bertwhistle is a grumpy man obsessed with contacting extraterrestrials. The boys like him to some degree, but he does not fare well with Jerry's father. Meanwhile Mrs. Bertwhistle is the librarian of the town's public library, she is also a very vocal activist against certain things she believes "corrupts" children.
Oscar is a local bum who everybody in the town looks down upon. Several years ago, he was a wealthy and respected person. Everything changed when, while being a beauty contest juror, he mistakenly gave the first place to Jerry, when Roy previously bribed him to make his daughter Mimmi win. After losing his wealth, he lives in an old shack. Most of the hildren are afraid of him.

Production
The Three Friends and Jerry was produced by Happy Life (Sweden) and TMO Film GmbH (Germany) in association with Nickelodeon UK and Nickelodeon Germany. Internationally, the series was distributed by HIT Entertainment.

In an interview from late 2020, Magnus Carlsson revealed many things about the development of the series. Carlsson first drew the characters around 1993 or 1994, and he later made an animated short starring the characters getting into trouble with drinking. When it was not picked up, he decided to retool the show to be more family-friendly, with him basing the main characters on actual friends he knew growing up (with Thomas being based on himself). When asked about questionable content in the show, Carlsson said that it was never a big deal or problem in Sweden.

The main characters' long foreheads were inspired by the film “Coneheads”.

He also initially wanted the theme song to be a reggae song but it was changed to a more Polka sounding melody.

Telecast and home media
In Sweden, the series first aired on SVT for its' original run. It later aired reruns on SVT Barn throughout the 2000s and early 2010s.

The show was originally aired in the United Kingdom on Nickelodeon and Nicktoons, with reruns remaining until 2010, mainly to fulfill European content guidelines.

In Germany, the show was planned to air on Nickelodeon Germany, and Nickelodeon Germany is listed in the first few episodes' credits. However, the original incarnation of Nick Germany shut down in mid-1998. As a result, the show would instead air on Fox Kids (later Jetix and Disney XD) from 2001 until 2009. The show also aired on KIKA until the late 2000s, and ProSieben MAXX from 2013 until 2014.

In the U.S., the show initially aired from 1998 until 2001 on the Fox Family Channel. In 2005, the show's distributor, HIT Entertainment, partnered to launch the PBS Kids Sprout channel. The show aired on Sprout until late 2006.

In Canada, the show aired on YTV, and in Australia, it aired on Nickelodeon. It also aired on NCRV in the Netherlands, Nickelodeon in Latin America, Boing in Spain, 2x2 in Russia, Premiere Austria in Austria, and Arutz HaYeladim in Israel.

The series mostly aired on Fox Kids/Jetix and Nickelodeon channels worldwide.

In the late 1990s-2000s, the show was released on VHS (in Sweden only) and DVDs internationally, but never released in North America. Most notably in Australia by Magna Home Entertainment, who released various episodes through 7 volumes.

Segments

References

External links
 
 PBS article about Three Friends and Jerry joining Sprout on Demand
 The Three Friends... And Jerry on TheTVDB

1990s British animated television series
1998 British television series debuts
1999 British television series endings
1998 Swedish television series debuts
1999 Swedish television series endings
1998 German television series debuts
1999 German television series endings
British children's animated comedy television series
German children's animated comedy television series
Swedish animated television series
Animated television series about children
Television series by Mattel Creations
Fox Kids
Nickelodeon original programming